Reznichenko is an East Slavic surname found in Ukraine and Russia. Notable people with the surname include:

Ihor Reznichenko (born 1994), Ukrainian figure skater
Nikolai Reznichenko (1952–2021), Russian military officer
Valentyn Reznichenko (born 1972), Ukrainian politician
Wladimir Resnitschenko (born 1965), Soviet-born German fencer

See also
 
House of Reznichenko

Russian-language surnames
Ukrainian-language surnames